The War at Home is a documentary film about the anti-war movement in the Madison, Wisconsin, area during the time of the Vietnam War. It combines archival footage and interviews with participants that explore the events of the period on the University of Wisconsin–Madison campus. The film was nominated for an Academy Award for Best Documentary Feature.

Synopsis
The film focuses on student protests of government policies in the Vietnam War, clashes between students and police, and the responses of politicians and the public to the turmoil. Among the major events included is the Sterling Hall bombing. Intended to destroy the Army Math Research Center in the building, the bombing also caused massive destruction to other parts of the building, resulting in the death of a physics researcher, Robert Fassnacht, who was not involved in the Army Math Research Center.  Bomber Karleton Armstrong, brother of Dwight Armstrong, is interviewed for the film, as is Paul Soglin, an antiwar leader who went on to be mayor of Madison.

Reception and legacy
It earned an Academy Award for Best Documentary Feature nomination.

Dialogue from The War at Home was used as samples in the song “Thieves” by the band Ministry on the 1989 album The Mind is a Terrible Thing to Taste.

Viewing the film after its recent restoration, Peter Canby writes in The New Yorker:The film covers the period from 1963—when the earliest demonstrators wore jackets and ties, in some cases smoked pipes, and attended teach-ins—to 1973. Along the way, there is extensive footage from dramatic Madison developments, including a police attack on antiwar demonstrators who had seized a campus building to protest the visit of Dow Chemical recruiters to campus. (Dow was the maker of napalm.) In that episode, the police clubbed—pretty much unprovoked—anyone they could get their hands on. In an unintentionally humorous moment, captured on film, a sociology professor named Maurice Zeitlin remembers students rushing in and asking him to talk sense to the police. Zeitlin runs out of his office, only to be clubbed from behind.Bill Siegel, director of The Trials of Muhammad Ali, was inspired to become a filmmaker after seeing the film.

Availability
In 2018, the film was restored in 4K by IndieCollect and re-released.

References

External links

Re-release prepared of film
Glenn Silber interview by Danny Peary
Excerpt

1979 films
American documentary films
Documentary films about the Vietnam War
1979 documentary films
Films directed by Barry Alexander Brown
1979 directorial debut films
1970s English-language films
1970s American films